Madhya Pradesh, often called the Heart of India, is a state in central India. Its capital is Bhopal. Madhya Pradesh was originally the largest state in India until November 1, 2000 when the state of Chhattisgarh was carved out. It borders the states Uttar Pradesh, Chhattisgarh, Maharashtra, Gujarat and Rajasthan.

Forest composition 

Sal

Mixed forests

Bamboo

Khair - Khair (Acacia catechu)

NWFP

Medicinal plants - Medicinal trees and plants of various kinds are found in abundance in the forests of Madhya Pradesh. Important ones are: Aegle marmelos, Azadirachta indica, Bixa orellana, Butea monosperma, Asparagus racemosus, Argemone mexicana, Buchanania cochinchinensis, Aloe barbadensis, Acorus calamus, Cassia tora, Curculigo orchioides, Curcuma longa, Embelia ribes, Clitoria ternatea,  Mangifera indica, Cassia fistula, Evolvulus alsinoides, Commiphora mukul, Helicteres isora, Holorrhaena antidysenterica, Glycyrrhiza glabra, Woodfordia fruticosa,. Dioscorea spp, Plumbago zeylaniea, Terminalia bellirica, Tamarindus indica,  Mucuna pruriens, Pongamia pinnata, Terminalia bellirica, Psoralea corylifolia, Phyllanthus embilica, Ocimum americanum, Rauvolfia serpentina, Tinospora cardifolio, Withania somnifera, Swertia chirayita, Tribulus terrestres, Chlorophytum tuberosum, Cyprus rotundus.

Forest growing stock 

The total growing stock (volume of timber / wood) is 50,000,000 m3 valued worth Rs 2.5 lakh Crores.

Protected areas 

Madhya Pradesh is home to 11 national parks, including Bandhavgarh National Park, Kanha National Park, Satpura National Park, Sanjay National Park, Madhav National Park, Van Vihar National Park, Mandla Plant Fossils National Park, Panna National Park, Pench National Park, Kuno National Park and dinosaur fossil National Park Madhya Pradesh]].

There are also a number of natural preserves, including Achanakmar-Amarkantak Biosphere Reserve, Patalkot, Bagh Caves, Bhedaghat, Bori Wildlife Sanctuary, Ken Gharial Sanctuary, Ghatigaon Wildlife Sanctuary, Kuno-Palpur Wildlife Sanctuary, Narwar, National Chambal Sanctuary, Kukdeshwar, Narsinghgarh, Nauradehi Wildlife Sanctuary, Pachmarhi Biosphere Reserve, Panpatha, Shikarganj, and Tamia.

National Parks and their Fauna 
There are 12 National Parks and 24 Sanctuaries spread over an area of 94,3489  km2 constituting 12.27% of the total forest area and 3.52% of the geographical area of the state.

Kanha, Bandhavgarh, Pench, Panna, and Satpura National Park are managed as project tiger areas.
Sardarpur sanctuary in Dhar and Sailana are managed for conservation of kharmore or lesser florican.
Ghatigaon sanctuary is managed for great Indian bustard or Son Chiriya.
National Chambal Sanctuary is managed for conservation of gharial and crocodile, river dolphin, smooth-coated otter and a number of turtle species.
Ken-gharial and Son-gharial sanctuaries are managed for conservation of gharial and mugger.
Barasingha is the state animal and dudhraj is the state bird of Madhya Pradesh.

Omkareshwar National Park 

Kuno National Park

List of sanctuaries 
There are 30 Wildlife sanctuaries in Madhya Pradesh. They are the following:
Bori Wildlife Sanctuary (Narmadapuram) 
Bagdara Sanctuary (Singrauli) 
Phen Sanctuary (Mandla) 
Ghatigaon Sanctuary (Gwalior) 
Gandhi Sagar Sanctuary (Mandsaur, Neemuch) 
Karera Sanctuary (Shivpuri) 
 Ken Gharial Sanctuary (Chhatarpur, Panna) 
Kheoni Wildlife Sanctuary (Dewas, Sehore) 
Narsingharh Sanctuary (Rajgarh) 
National Chambal Sanctuary (Morena) 
Nauradehi Wildlife Sanctuary (Sagar, Damoh, Narsinghpur) 
Pachmarhi Sanctuary (Narmadapuram) 
Panpatha Sanctuary (Umaria) 
Kuno Wildlife Sanctuary (Sheopur) 
Pench National Park (Seoni) 
Ratapani Tiger Reserve (Raisen, Sehore) 
Sanjay-Dubri Wildlife Sanctuary (Sidhi) 
Singhori Sanctuary (Raisen) 
Son Ghariyal Sanctuary (Sidhi) 
Sardarpur Sanctuary (Dhar) 
Sailana Sanctuary (Ratlam) 
 Ralamandal wildlife Sanctuary (Indore) 
Orchha Sanctuary (Niwari) 
Gangau Sanctuary (Panna) 
Veerangna Durgawati Sanctuary (Damoh)

Climate 
Madhya Pradesh has a subtropical climate. Like most of north India, it has a hot dry summer (April–June) followed by monsoon rains (July–September) and a cool and relatively dry winter. The average rainfall is about 1,370 mm (53.9 in). It decreases from east to west. The south-eastern districts have the heaviest rainfall, some places receiving as much as 2,150 mm (84.6 in), while the western and north-western districts receive 1,000 mm (39.4 in) or less.

The Tribals and Forests 

The tribal population is an integral part of the biodiversity of the forests since ages. A large number of ethnic aboriginal tribes are there who live in and around forests in Madhya Pradesh. The main tribal groups are:

Bhils
Barelas
Bhilalas
Patliya
Korku
Movasiruma
Nahala
Vavari
Bodoya
Agaria
Baiga
Bijhwar
Narotia
Bharotiya
Nahar
Rai Bhaina
Kadh Bhaina
Kaul
Rohiya
Rauthail
Saharia
Bharia
Bhumiya
Bhuihar
Pando
Gond
Pardhan
Agariya
Ojha
Nagarchi
Solhas
Halba
Halbi
Bastariya
Chhatisgarhiya
Mariya
Abujh Mariya,
Dandami Mariya,
Metakoitur

See also 
Flora of Madhya Pradesh

Gallery

References

 Madhya Pradesh Forest Department
Minor Forest Produce Federation Madhya Pradesh
 Madhya Pradesh A to Z, Madhya Pradesh State Tourism Development Corporation, Cross Section Publications Pvt. Ltd., New Delhi 1994

 
Fauna of Madhya Pradesh
Madhya Pradesh-related lists
Madhya Pradesh